Holopedium gibberum is a species of water flea in the family Holopediidae. It is found in Europe.

References

Further reading

 

Cladocera
Articles created by Qbugbot
Crustaceans described in 1855